Aurorarctos is an extinct North American genus of bears in the Ursinae subfamily. It contains a single species, Aurorarctos tirawa, which lived in the Middle Miocene (15–12.5 Mya). The genus name combines the Latin words aurora (dawn) and Greek arctos (bear); the specific epithet references the creation god Tirawa in Pawnee mythology.

References

Miocene bears
Prehistoric carnivoran genera